The House of Fear may refer to:

 The House of Fear (novel), a 1955 translation of Ibne Safi's Khaufnaak Imaraat
 The House of Fear (1915 film), an Ashton-Kirk silent mystery
 The House of Fear (1939 film), an American mystery directed by Joe May
 The House of Fear (1945 film), a Sherlock Holmes crime film